The Apollo of Cyrene is a colossal Roman statue of Apollo found at the ancient city of Cyrene, Libya. It was unearthed at the site along with a large number of other ancient sculptures and inscriptions which were presented to the British Museum in 1861.

Discovery
This enormous sculpture was discovered in the mid-nineteenth century at the Temple of Apollo at Cyrene in Libya. It was excavated by the British explorers and amateur archaeologists Captain Robert Murdoch Smith and Commander Edwin A. Porcher. The statue was found broken into 121 pieces, lying near the large plinth where it originally stood. The fragments were later reassembled in the British Museum to create a relatively intact statue with only the right arm and left hand missing.

Description
The statue dates to the 2nd century AD, and is a copy of a Hellenistic work probably dating to between 200 and 150 BC.  It is made from high quality marble and would have originally been painted. The god is shown nude with the exception of a cloak wrapped around his hips. As the god of music, he is shown playing a lyre, with a python nestled below. The statue has a curious mixture of masculine and feminine characteristics, which reflects its Hellenistic origin.

Temple of Apollo
The statue was probably the main cult image in the Temple of Apollo at Cyrene. The deity would have acted as the focal point for worship and ritual activity.

Gallery

References

Further reading
L. Burn, The British Museum book of Greek and Roman Art, revised edition (London, The British Museum Press, 1999)
P. Higgs, 'The Cyrene Apollo', History Today, 44 (11), pp. 50–54

1861 archaeological discoveries
Ancient Greek and Roman sculptures in the British Museum
Archaeological discoveries in Libya
Sculptures of Apollo
Ancient Cyrenaica
Ancient Greek and Roman colossal statues
Colossal statues in the United Kingdom
Marble sculptures in the United Kingdom
Cult images